Azriel, Asriel or Ezriel may refer to:

People
 Azriel of Gerona (c. 1160–c. 1238), Catalan kabbalist
 Azriel Hildesheimer (1820–1899), German rabbi
 Azriel Rabinowitz (1905–1941), Lithuanian rabbi and Holocaust victim
 Azriel Rosenfeld (1931–2004), American professor and expert on computer image analysis
 Azriel Graeber (born 1948), Talmudic Scholar and founder of the Jewish Scholarship Society
 Azriel Lévy (born 1934), Logician, Hebrew University, Jerusalem
 Ezriel Carlebach (1909–1956), Israeli journalist

Fictional characters
 Lord Asriel, a character in His Dark Materials by Philip Pullman
 the title character's name in the Anne Rice novel Servant of the Bones
 Asriel, a character in the 2015 indie game Undertale
 Azrael, a character in the novel series No Game No Life
 Azriel, a character in A Court of Thorns and Roses by Sarah J Maas
 Azriel, the supernatural antagonist in the Netflix series Warrior Nun (TV series)
 Azriel the father of Seraiah in the Bible, see Jeremiah 36#Verse 26

Other uses
 Azrael, the traditional name of the angel of death in many religions
 Azri'el, a moshav in central Israel
 "Azriel (Angel of Death)" and "Azriel Revisited", songs by rock group The Nice

See also
 Asriel (disambiguation)
 Azrael (disambiguation)

Hebrew masculine given names